Thomas Alexander Pottenger (June 9, 1920 – October 24, 2003) was an American politician. He was a member of the Ohio House of Representatives. Originally elected to the House in 1968, Pottenger served two terms before losing the primary election to Richard Finan, much due to an unpopular vote regarding taxes. However, he made a comeback in 1976 by doing the same to fellow Republican John Brandenberg.

In 1990, Pottenger resigned from his House seat to take a position on the Ohio Employment Relations Board. He would serve on the SERB for a number of years in the Nineties. Pottenger died in 2003.

References

Republican Party members of the Ohio House of Representatives
1920 births
2003 deaths
20th-century American politicians